Gerardo Fernández (born 24 September 1953) is a Cuban weightlifter. He competed at the 1976 Summer Olympics and the 1980 Summer Olympics.

References

1953 births
Living people
Cuban male weightlifters
Olympic weightlifters of Cuba
Weightlifters at the 1976 Summer Olympics
Weightlifters at the 1980 Summer Olympics
Place of birth missing (living people)
Pan American Games medalists in weightlifting
Pan American Games gold medalists for Cuba
Weightlifters at the 1975 Pan American Games
20th-century Cuban people